Climate Solutions Road Tour, held between January 2 and February 4, 2009, was a project initiated by the Indian Youth Climate Network which started off at Chennai, India. Ten members of the Indian Youth Climate Network and a solar-powered band "Solar Punch" covered more than 3,500 kilometers. 

The objective of the tour had been defined "to document a trail across the nation of climate solutions and empower youth along the route to create, communicate and celebrate their own solutions."

The road tour which began in Chennai on January 2, 2009 covered 15 major cities including Bangalore, Hyderabad, Pune, Mumbai, Ahmedabad, Jaipur, Delhi, Udaipur, Delhi, Dungarpur, Tilonia, and Goa. The tour successfully ended on 5 February at Delhi.

References

External links
 Climate Solutions Road Tour
 Climate Solutions Road Tour blog

Climate change in India
Climate change organizations